The Russian Psychological Society (RPS) is the official professional association of Russian psychologists. RPS is a member of the European Federation of Psychologists' Associations and the International Union of Psychological Science.

Work, aims and scopes 

The Society was established to support career development of Russian psychologists and to promote psychological science in Russian Federation. Among its key aims are promoting psychology for the public good, making it accessible to all, providing support to its members, and hosting conferences and events.

In reaching its aims the Society is actively engaged in publishing, supports research in the field of psychology and works to ensure high standards of psychological education, training and practice in Russian Federation.

History 

Its first honorable members were Wilhelm Wundt, Theodule Ribot, Hermann Ludwig Ferdinand von Helmholtz, William James, Edward Bradford Titchener.

The Russian Revolution of 1917, two World Wars and political reforms of the newly established Soviet State brought the official activity of the Russian Psychological Society to a hold. It was fully resumed in 1957 under the name of The Union of Psychologists of USSR.

Its current name of the Russian Psychological Society was taken in 1994 following the independence of Russian Federation.

Presidents 

 1885–1887 
 1888–1899 
 1899–1920 
 1957–1963 Smirnov, Anatoliy Aleksandrovich
 1963–1968 
 1968–1983 
 1994–2001 Klimov, Eugeniy Aleksandrovich
 2001–2007 

Since 2007 and to the present time the President of the Russian Psychological Society is a professor, corresponding member of the Russian Academy of Education, doctor in Psychology, Yury P. Zinchenko

Journals

Psychology in Russia: State of the Art 
Psychology in Russia: State of the Art is an annual academic journal covering all areas of psychology. Established in 2008, Russian Psychological Society's annual series Psychology in Russia: State of the Art presents a collection of original articles on Russian theoretical and empirical research to date. It traditionally covers various domains of psychological science, like cognitive, clinical, developmental, social psychology, neuropsychology, psychophysiology, psychology of labor and ergonomics, and methodology of psychological science.
It is indexed in:
 Russian Index of Scientific Citing
 Directory of Open Access Journals
 Academic Search Premier EBSCOPublishing
 PsycINFO
 Scopus.

National Psychological Journal 

The National Psychological Journal covers current issues from the perspective of the psychological science, publishes scientific and journalistic work in the field of psychology, reviews of scientific articles and books on psychology, the materials on international scientific conferences, congresses, classical domestic and foreign psychology. 
The authors are scientists, teachers of the Lomonosov Moscow State University, University of St. Petersburg and other universities in Russia and abroad, members from various ministries, departments, research laboratories and psychological services.

Thematic focus of the journal:
 Socio-psychological aspects of social life and economic priorities of Russia;
 Professional standards of training of professional psychologists;
 Psychological aspects of national security;
 Psychological issues of the priority national projects (health of the nation, the family and the school, the prevention of child abandonment and neglect, education, innovation and innovation in science, culture, etc.);
 Monitoring of Psychological Science in Russia and abroad;
 Basic and Applied Psychology, scientific instruments.

Honorary Members 
Honorary members of RPS:
 Lunt Ingrid Cecilia  Great Britain. Psychologist 
 Stanislav Grof Czech Republic, United States. Psychologist, psychiatrist, psychoanalyst
 Juri L. Hanin Russia, Finland. Psychologist
 Viktor A. Sadovnichiy Russia. Mathematician
 Sergey K. Shoigu Russia. Minister of Defence
 Alexander Bain Scotland. Philosopher, mathematician, psychologist, teacher
 Wilhelm Windelband Germany. Philosopher, teacher 
 Wilhelm Wundt Germany. Physician, physiologist, psychologist, teacher 
 Karl Robert Eduard von Hartmann Germany. Philosopher, psychologist 
 Hermann von Helmholtz Germany. Physicist, physician, physiologist, psychologist, teacher 
  Harald Høffding Denmark, philosopher, historian, psychologist, teacher 
  William James USA. Doctor, psychologist, philosopher, psychologist 
 Emil du Bois-Reymond Germany. Psychologist, philosopher 
 Théodule Ribot France. Philosopher, psychologist, teacher 
 Charles Richet France. Physiologist, psychologist, teacher 
 Herbert Spencer Great Britain. Philosopher, sociologist, psychologist 
 Edward B. Titchener United Kingdom, United States of America (USA). Psychologist, teacher 
 Eduard Zeller Germany. Philosopher, theologian, historian

References

External links 
 

Psychology organizations